Charles Nall-Cain may refer to:

 Charles Nall-Cain, 1st Baron Brocket (1866–1934), British businessman and philanthropist
 Charles Nall-Cain, 3rd Baron Brocket (born 1952), British peer, business owner, television presenter and convicted criminal